Goose Pond is a small lake south-southeast of Big Moose in Herkimer County, New York. It drains south via an unnamed creek that flows into Lake Rondaxe. It is part of the Moose River watershed, which flows west to the Black River and ultimately Lake Ontario.

See also
 List of lakes in New York

References 

Lakes of New York (state)
Lakes of Herkimer County, New York